Peabody Building of the Peabody-Williams School is an American historic school building located in Petersburg, Virginia.  The structure opened in 1920 as a public high school for African American students in Petersburg's segregated public school system.  The building was designed by noted Virginia architect Charles M. Robinson.  It is a two-story, red brick building that was originally part of a campus that included a junior high school and an elementary school.

The building was listed on the National Register of Historic Places in 2000, but is now closed. A new middle school was built adjacent to it, and remains in use.

References

African-American history of Virginia
School buildings on the National Register of Historic Places in Virginia
School buildings completed in 1920
Buildings and structures in Petersburg, Virginia
National Register of Historic Places in Petersburg, Virginia
1920 establishments in Virginia